Barrie Brown (25 June 1931 – 13 October 2014) was an Australian rules football player. In 1952 he played two games with the Richmond Football Club in the Victorian Football League (VFL).

References

External links
 
 

1931 births
2014 deaths
Richmond Football Club players
Australian rules footballers from Victoria (Australia)